Abortion in Georgia is legal up to the start of embryonic cardiac-cell activity, which typically begins in the 5th or 6th week after the onset of the last menstrual period (LMP) or in two to three weeks after implantation. This law came into force on July 20, 2022, almost a month after the U.S. Supreme Court's Dobbs v. Jackson Women's Health Organization,  ruling. In 2007, mandatory ultrasound requirements were passed by state legislators. Georgia has continually sought to legislate against abortion at a state level since 2011. The most recent example, 2019's HB 481, sought to make abortion illegal as soon as embryonic (or fetal) cardiac electrical activity can be detected; in most cases that is around the six-week mark of a pregnancy. Many women are not aware they are pregnant at this time. An injunction was issued against this bill by a federal judge, who ruled that it contravened the Supreme Court's 1973 ruling. A poll conducted by the Pew Research Center in 2014 found that 49% of Georgians believed abortions should be illegal in all or most cases vs 48% legal in all or most cases.

The number of abortion clinics has been on the decline for many years, going from 82 in 1982 to 55 in 1992 and further falling to 17 in 2014. Due to tight restrictions in neighbouring states, as well as cost issues, thousands of women come from out of state to have abortions in Georgia. There were 30,013 legal abortions in 2014, and 31,009 in 2015. 14.5% of all abortions carried out in 2015 were for out of state residents.  There is an active pro-choice movement in the state. This received a surge in donations following the passing of the state's controversial 2019 bill. Women from the state participated in marches supporting abortion as part of a #StoptheBans movement in May 2019. On July 20, 2022, this six-week abortion ban became law, instituting the current ban after the start of embryonic cardiac-cell activity.

Abortions after the fifth or sixth week of pregnancy are decriminalized in the Georgia cities of Atlanta and Savannah.

History 
Thousands of women came from out of state in 2015 to get abortions in North Carolina and Georgia. 14.5% of all abortions in Georgia that year were for out-of-state residents, while 7.5% of all abortions performed in North Carolina were performed for out-of-state residents. This contrasted to neighboring South Carolina, where only 5.9% of abortions performed in the state involved out-of-state residents.

In the late 1960s and early 1970s, Arkansas, Colorado, Georgia, Maryland, New Mexico, North Carolina and Oregon made reforms to their abortion laws, with most of these states providing more detailed medical guidance on when therapeutic abortions could be performed. In 1962, the American Law Institute published their model penal code as it applied to abortions with three circumstances where they believed a physician could justifiably perform an abortion, "If ... there is substantial risk that the continuance of the pregnancy would gravely impair the physical or mental health of the mother or that the child would be born with grave physical or mental defect, or that the pregnancy resulted from rape, incest, or other felonious intercourse." In 1968, Georgia implemented a version of this but created an exception where they did not allow abortion in the case of incest.

The state passed a law in the 2000s banning abortions at 22 weeks because they alleged that fetuses can feel pain. The state was one of 23 states in 2007 to have a detailed abortion-specific informed consent requirement. Georgia, Michigan, Arkansas and Idaho all required that women must be provided the option by an abortion clinic to view an image of their fetus if an ultrasound is used prior to the abortion taking place. Informed consent materials about fetal pain at 20-weeks in Arkansas, Georgia and Oklahoma say, "the unborn child has the physical structures necessary to experience pain."  The Journal of the American Medical Association has concluded that pain sensors do not develop in the fetus until between weeks 23 and 30. Georgia and Wisconsin were two of the only 22 states with written informed consent materials referring women to "crisis pregnancy centers" which acknowledged these centers did not support or provide women with abortion related services.

In 2011, the state was one of six where the legislature introduced a bill that would have banned abortion in almost all cases. It did not pass. This was repeated in 2012, where the state was one of three to unsuccessfully try to ban abortion.

The law as of March 2019 required that women wait 24 hours after their initial appointment for an abortion before they could have a second appointment for the actual procedure. This could be waived in case of medical emergency, allowing a woman to receive mandatory counseling over the phone or via a website. State law at the time prohibited health insurance companies on public exchanges from offering abortion services unless the life of the woman was at risk.

Georgia had a six-week abortion ban slated to go into effect in 2019, which would have made it illegal to obtain an abortion in the state once embryonic or fetal cardiac electrical activity could be detected. The law made no exception for cases of rape or incest and mandated a penalty in prison for doctors who perform the procedure, but noted specifically that this was not referring to the women who get this procedure done. Rep. Ed Setzler introduced that law, HB 481, in the Georgia House of Representatives on February 25, 2019. During his campaign for Governor, Brian Kemp, now the Governor of Georgia, "vow[ed] to sign the toughest abortion laws in the country" and when asked about litigation, said, "bring it! I'll fight for life at the Capitol and in the courtroom." After being passed in the House on March 7, 2019, HB 481 was passed out of a Senate committee on March 18, 2019. It was subsequently passed by the entire state Senate, after which it was narrowly passed by the House 92–78. The bill was signed by Governor Kemp on May 7, 2019. Georgia was one of several states passing similar bills in April and May 2019, alongside Missouri, Louisiana, and Alabama. However, the American Civil Liberties Union, Planned Parenthood and the Center for Reproductive Rights sued the state in June 2019 and sought an injunction against enforcement of the bill before it would go into effect in January 2020. The case was heard in the United States District Court for the Northern District of Georgia under Judge Steve C. Jones. Jones ruled in favor of the injunction to block enforcement in his decision in October 2019, stating "By banning pre-viability abortions, H.B. 481 violates the constitutional right to privacy, which, in turn, inflicts per se irreparable harm on Plaintiffs." In July 2020, the bill was ruled unconstitutional by Judge Jones.

In June 24, 2022, the Atlanta City Council passed a resolution to decriminalize abortion after the sixth week of pregnancy.

In an audio from a campaign stop in Blakely on October 13, 2022, Governor Brian Kemp said he "liked the idea" of a "statewide ban on the destruction of embryos" regardless of the reason or the health risk to the mother.

Judicial history 
The US Supreme Court's decision in 1973's Roe v. Wade ruling meant the state could no longer regulate abortion in the first trimester.  However, the Supreme Court overturned Roe v. Wade in Dobbs v. Jackson Women's Health Organization,  later in 2022. In 1973, the US Supreme Court also ruled in a case named Doe v. Bolton. The 7–2 ruling invalidated the law in Georgia that said a woman needed to seek and attain permission from three physicians before she could have an abortion performed on her. The Court said Georgia's law put too many restrictions on women seeking to get abortions, making it unconstitutional.

After HB 481 was passed in May 2019, the American Civil Liberties Union, Planned Parenthood, and the Center for Reproductive Rights sued the state and sought an injunction against enforcement of the ban before it would go into effect in January 2020. The case was heard in the United States District Court for the Northern District of Georgia under Judge Steve C. Jones. Jones ruled in favor of the injunction to block enforcement in his decision in October 2019, stating "By banning pre-viability abortions, H.B. 481 violates the constitutional right to privacy, which, in turn, inflicts per se irreparable harm on Plaintiffs."

The Georgia Supreme Court on November 23, 2022 reinstated the state’s ban on abortions for fetal process after 6 weeks of pregnancy.

Statistics 
In the period between 1972 and 1974, the state had an illegal abortion mortality rate per million women aged 15–44 of between 0.1 and 0.9. In 1990, 796,000 women in the state faced the risk of an unintended pregnancy. In 2010, the state had eight publicly funded abortions, of which all eight were federally funded. In 2014, 49% of adults said in a poll by the Pew Research Center that abortion should be illegal in all or most cases with 48% believing it should be legal.

According to a 2020 study, the 22-week law reduced the number of abortions after 21 weeks.

Footnotes

References 

Georgia
Healthcare in Georgia (U.S. state)
Women in Georgia (U.S. state)